Muhamad Rafi Syarahil (born on 15 November 2000), is an Indonesian professional footballer who plays as a defensive midfielder for Liga 1 club Barito Putera.

International career
Rafi is one of the players that strengthen Indonesia U19 in 2018 AFC U-19 Championship.

Career statistics

Club

International goals
International under-23 goals

Honours

International 
Indonesia U-19
 AFF U-19 Youth Championship third place: 2018
Indonesia U-22
 AFF U-22 Youth Championship: 2019

References

External links
 Raffi Syarahil at Soccerway
 Raffi Syarahil at Liga Indonesia

2000 births
Living people
Indonesian footballers
Sportspeople from Jakarta
PS Barito Putera players
Liga 1 (Indonesia) players
Indonesia youth international footballers
Association football midfielders